James Reiss (July 11, 1941 – December 2, 2016) was an American poet and novelist.

Biography
Reiss grew up in the Washington Heights section of New York City and in northern New Jersey. He earned his B.A. and his M.A. in English from the University of Chicago.

His poems have appeared in magazines that include The Atlantic, Esquire, The Nation, The New Republic, The New Yorker, Poetry,  Slate, and Virginia Quarterly Review.

He has won grants from the Creative Artists Public Service Program of the New York State Council on the Arts, the National Endowment for the Arts, the New York Foundation for the Arts and the Ohio Arts Council. He has received awards from, among others, the Academy of American Poets, the Poetry Society of America, the Pushcart Press and the Unterberg Poetry Center of the 92nd Street Y in New York City. From 1971-1974 he was a regular poetry critic for The Plain Dealer in Cleveland, Ohio. In 1977 he won first prize in New York’s Big Apple Bicentennial Poetry Contest. He won four annual Zeitfunk awards for his reviewing, in 2007-2010, from the Public Radio Exchange, PRX.

In 1975-76 he taught as poet-in-residence at Queens College, CUNY.

He was Professor Emeritus of English and Founding Editor of Miami University Press at Miami University in Oxford, Ohio.

At the time of his death, he lived in Wilmette, Illinois near Chicago.

Bibliography

Books
Façade for a Penny Arcade [Spuyten Duyvil Publishing|Spuyten Duyvil], 2017)
When Yellow Leaves [Spuyten Duyvil Publishing|Spuyten Duyvil], 2016)
The Novel (WordTech Communications, 2015)
Greatest Hits: 1970-2005 (Pudding House Press, 2005)
Riff on Six: New and Selected Poems (Salt Publishing, 2003)
Ten Thousand Good Mornings (Carnegie Mellon University Press, 2001)
The Parable of Fire (Carnegie Mellon University Press, 1996)	
Express (University of Pittsburgh Press, 1983)
The Breathers (Ecco Press, 1974)
Self-Interviews: James Dickey, co-ed. (Doubleday, 1970; Louisiana State University Press, 1984)

External links

James Reiss
The Poetry Foundation
Faculty Page, Miami University English Department
James Reiss Collection in the Walter Havighurst Special Collections, Miami University
'James Reiss: Poet and Professor Emeritus of English, Miami University'
Public Radio Exchange: Comments by James Reiss
Poetry 180: My Daughters in New York, by James Reiss

1941 births
2016 deaths
American male poets
Miami University faculty
People from Washington Heights, Manhattan
University of Chicago alumni